The 448th Supply Chain Management Wing, a wing of the Air Force Sustainment Center of Air Force Materiel Command serves as the Air Force's supply chain manager headquartered at Tinker Air Force Base, Oklahoma.

The wing was first activated in the reserve as the 448th Bombardment Wing in 1949 when Continental Air Command converted its reserve flying organizations under the wing base organization system.  It was called to active duty in 1951 for the Korean War, but inactivated a few days when its personnel were transferred to other units.

It was activated again as the 448th Fighter-Bomber Wing in 1955, when it replaced a flying training wing at Hensley Field, Texas.  It was inactivated two years later when the Air Force converted its reserve flying units to troop carrier units.

Mission
Plan and execute the Air Force supply chain to enable weapon system employment when and where needed.

History

 For additional history and lineage, see 448th Fighter-Bomber Group
The wing was first activated at Long Beach Municipal Airport when Continental Air Command reorganized its reserve flying units under the wing base organization system as the headquarters for the 448th Bombardment Group, which was already stationed at Long Beach, and the 448th's support elements.  The wing was equipped with Douglas B-26 Invaders and a variety of trainers. It trained as a reserve bombardment wing under supervision of the 2347th Air Force Reserve Training Center.

The wing lost more than half of its personnel in August 1950 when the 452d Bombardment Wing, also located at Long Beach, was called to active service as a result of the Korean War. The 448th was ordered to active service in March 1951 as the war continued, but its personnel were used as fillers in other units.

The wing was reactivated as the 448th Fighter Bomber Wing in May 1955.  It replaced the 8708th Pilot Training Wing at Hensley Field, Texas and took over the 8708th's North American T-28 Trojans.  It trained as a reserve fighter-bomber wing with Lockheed F-80 Shooting Stars
under the 2683d Air Reserve Center until inactivated in 1957, shortly after acquiring North American F-86 Sabres. The Air Force decided in the late 1950s to convert all its operational reserve units to troop carrier units.  Its place at Hensley was taken by the reserve 69th Troop Carrier Squadron.

In 2012 the following four groups were assigned to the wing:
 638th Supply Chain Management Group at Robins Air Force Base, Georgia
 748th Supply Chain Management Group at Hill Air Force Base, Utah
 848th Supply Chain Management Group at Tinker Air Force Base, Oklahoma
 948th Supply Chain Management Group at Tinker Air Force Base, Oklahoma

Lineage
 Constituted as the 448th Bombardment Wing, Light on 10 May 1949
 Activated in the reserve on 27 June 1949
 Ordered into active service on 17 March 1951
 Inactivated on 21 March 1951
 Redesignated 448th Fighter-Bomber Wing on 12 April 1955
 Activated in the reserve on 18 May 1955
 Inactivated on 16 November 1957
 Redesignated 448th Tactical Fighter Wing on 31 July 1985 (remained inactive)
 Redesignated 448th Combat Sustainment Wing on 31 January 2005
 Activated on 18 February 2005
 Redesignated: 448th Supply Chain Management Wing on 1 April 2008

Assignments
 Fourth Air Force, 27 June 1949 – 21 March 1951
 Fourteenth Air Force, 18 May 1955 – 16 November 1957
 Oklahoma City Air Logistics Center (later Oklahoma City Air Logistics Complex), 18 February 2005 (attached to Air Force Sustainment Center after 11 July 2012)
 Air Force Sustainment Center, 1 October 2012 – present

Components
 448th Air Base Group: 27 June 1949 – 21 March 1951; 18 May 1955 – 16 November 1957
 448th Aircraft Commodities Sustainment Group: 18 February 2005 – 14 April 2006
 448th Fighter-Bomber Group (later 448th Eagle Propulsion Sustainment Group, 448th Combat Sustainment Group, 448th Supply Chain Management Group): 27 June 1949 – 21 March 1951; 18 May 1955 – 16 November 1957; 18 February 2005 – 30 June 2010
 448th Hawk Propulsion Sustainment Group, 18 February 2005 – 14 April 2006
 448th Maintenance and Supply Group: 27 June 1949 – 21 March 1951; 18 May 1955 – 16 November 1957
 448th Materiel Sustainment Group, 18 February 2005 – 14 April 2006
 448th Medical Group (later 448th Tactical Hospital): 27 June 1949 – 21 March 1951; 18 May 1955 – 16 November 1957
 638th Supply Chain Management Group: 1 April 2008 – present
 Robins Air Force Base, Georgia
 748th Combat Sustainment Group (later 748th Supply Chain Management Group): 14 April 2006 – present
 Hill Air Force Base, Utah
 848th Combat Sustainment Group (later 848th Supply Chain Management Group): 14 April 2006 – present
 948th Combat Sustainment Group (later 948th Supply Chain Management Group): 14 April 2006 – present

Stations
 Long Beach Municipal Airport, California 27 June 1949 – 21 March 1951
 Hensley Field (later Naval Air Station Dallas), Texas 18 May 1955 – 16 November 1957
 Tinker Air Force Base, Oklahoma, 18 February 2005 – present

Aircraft

 North American T-6 Texan, 1949–1950
 Beechcraft T-7 Navigator, 1949–1951
 Beechcraft T-11 Kansan, 1949–1951
 Douglas B-26 Invader, 1949–1951
 North American T-28 Trojan, 1955, 1955–1957
 Lockheed T-33 T-Bird, 1955–1957
 Lockheed F-80 Shooting Star, 1955–1957
 North American F-86 Sabre, 1957

See also
 List of Douglas A-26 Invader operators
 List of F-86 Sabre units

References

Notes
 Explanatory notes

 Citations

Bibliography

External links
Tinker AFB Home Page

Military units and formations in Oklahoma
Wings of the United States Air Force
Sustainment wings of the United States Air Force
Military units and formations established in 1949
Logistics units and formations of the United States Air Force